Milton Estrella (born 15 October 1954) is an Ecuadorian judoka. He competed in the men's middleweight event at the 1980 Summer Olympics.

References

1954 births
Living people
Ecuadorian male judoka
Olympic judoka of Ecuador
Judoka at the 1980 Summer Olympics
Place of birth missing (living people)